A132 or A-132 may refer to:
 A132 road (England), a road connecting Pitsea and South Woodham Ferrers
 A132 motorway (France), a road connecting the A13 and Deauville / Trouville-sur-Mer
 A132 road (Malaysia), a road in Perak connecting Bidor and Kampung Poh
 Aerotec A-132 Tangará, a 1960s Brazilian military trainer aircraft 
 RFA Diligence (A132), a 1981 Royal Fleet Auxiliary fleet repair ship
 RFA Eddybeach (A132), a 1951 Royal Fleet Auxiliary coastal tanker